Rhys Rees (birth unknown – death unknown) was a Welsh professional rugby league footballer who played in the 1900s and 1910s.

International honours
Rees won caps for Wales while at Merthyr Tydfil in 1908 against England and in 1910 against England, and represented Welsh League XIII while at Merthyr Tydfil in the 14-13 victory over Australia at Penydarren Park, Merthyr Tydfil on Tuesday 19 January 1909.

References

External links

Merthyr Tydfil RLFC players
Wigan Warriors players
Place of birth missing
Place of death missing
Rugby league five-eighths
Rugby league halfbacks
Wales national rugby league team players
Welsh League rugby league team players
Welsh rugby league players
Year of birth missing
Year of death missing